Chastain Motorsports is a team in the Indy Racing League owned by Indianapolis businessman Tom Chastain. The team was founded in 1997 and raced until 1998 with driver Stephan Gregoire. Gregoire finished 11th in driver points in '97 and 12th in '98 with a best race finish of 2nd at Pikes Peak International Raceway in 1997. At the end of the 1998 season the team ceased operations. Chastain returned to IndyCar after a 9-year absence for the 2007 Indianapolis 500, again with Gregoire driving. However, Gregoire was injured in a practice crash and Roberto Moreno was named as the replacement driver. Moreno qualified 31st with the fastest 4 lap average of any Panoz chassis but was the first to crash out and finished in 33rd and last place. The Linux community attempted to raise money to sponsor the car and gain awareness for the Linux product, however they fell short of their goals and only raised enough for minor associate sponsorship.

Complete IRL IndyCar Series results
(key) (Results in bold indicate pole position; results in italics indicate fastest lap)

External links
Tux 500 sponsorship site

1997 establishments in Indiana
IndyCar Series teams
American auto racing teams
Auto racing teams established in 1997